Tillman Theodore Ogdahl (October 1, 1921 – July 29, 1988) was an American football player and coach. He served as the head football coach at Willamette University in Salem, Oregon from 1952 to 1971, compiling a record of 98–64–10.

Head coaching record

College

References

External links
 

1921 births
1988 deaths
American football fullbacks
American football halfbacks
Willamette Bearcats football coaches
Willamette Bearcats football players
High school football coaches in Oregon